The 2005 Lehigh Mountain Hawks football team was an American football team that represented Lehigh University during the 2005 NCAA Division I-AA football season. Lehigh finished third in the Patriot League.

In their fifth and final year under head coach Pete Lembo, the Mountain Hawks compiled an 8–3 record. Mark Borda, Kaloma Cardwell, Anthony Graziani and Adam Selmasska were the team captains.

The Mountain Hawks outscored opponents 399 to 228. Their 4–2 conference record placed third out of seven in the Patriot League. 

The Mountain Hawks were ranked No. 14 in the preseason Division I-AA national poll. They remained in the top 25, ranging as high as No. 11 and as low as No. 20, until the final week of the regular season. A loss to unranked archrival Lafayette dropped Lehigh out of the final poll.

Lehigh played its home games at Goodman Stadium on the university's Goodman Campus in Bethlehem, Pennsylvania.

Schedule

References

Lehigh
Lehigh Mountain Hawks football seasons
Lehigh Mountain Hawks football